Time FM (时光电台) is a comedy series produced by Dreamteam Studios and ntv7 in 2011. It stars Adrian Tan, Yeo Yann Yann, Alvin Wong, Jane Ng and Melvin Sia. This 13 episode comedy series started airing on 28 April 2011 every Thursday at 11 pm.

Synopsis
Time FM is a comedy series about Ke Jun Xiong who can time travel to Time FM in the 1980s. On his first day working as the office boy, he used a toilet which brings him back to 1981. Each episode starts with quote from newspaper during 1981, which is mainly the announcements of Tun Dr. Mahathir Mohamad, as the prime minister of Malaysia that year. Viewers are exposed to Mahathir's work during the 1980s, his early years as the prime minister.

Cast
Adrian Chen Kai Xuan as Ke Junxiong / Ke Huan
Yeo Yann Yann as Lucky Jie
Alvin Wong as Hua Tai Zhang / Jian Hua Lang
Melvin Sia as Zhang Jia Ming / Cikgu Cheong
Jane Ng Ming Hui as Huang Wan Jun
Qin Wen Bing as Xia Lei Meng
Ken Tan as You Cha Gui
Ye Qing Fang as Lao Chi Cheong
Zhu Jian Mei as Xiao Niu / Tea Lady

References

Chinese-language drama television series in Malaysia
2011 Malaysian television series debuts
2011 Malaysian television series endings